is a Japanese footballer who plays for J2 League club JEF United Chiba.

Club statistics
Updated to 31 January 2018.

1includes Japanese Super Cup appearances.

Reserves performance

Last Updated: 26 February 2019

References

External links 

 Profile at Renofa Yamaguchi FC 

1992 births
Living people
Association football people from Kagoshima Prefecture
Japanese footballers
J1 League players
J2 League players
J3 League players
Japan Football League players
Verspah Oita players
Renofa Yamaguchi FC players
Cerezo Osaka players
Cerezo Osaka U-23 players
Mito HollyHock players
Avispa Fukuoka players
JEF United Chiba players
Association football midfielders
People from Kagoshima